Svetlana Melnikova (born 29 January 1951) is a retired female discus thrower and shot putter, who represented the Soviet Union during her career. Melnikova is best known for winning the gold medal in the women's discus throw event at the 1979 Summer Universiade in Mexico City, Mexico.

References
mastersathletics
hem.bredband.net

1951 births
Living people
Soviet female shot putters
Russian female discus throwers
Soviet female discus throwers
Russian female shot putters
Universiade medalists in athletics (track and field)
Universiade gold medalists for the Soviet Union
Medalists at the 1977 Summer Universiade
Medalists at the 1979 Summer Universiade